The Men's downhill competition at the FIS Alpine World Ski Championships 2023 was held at L'Éclipse ski course in Courchevel on 12 February 2023.

Results
The race was started at 11:00.

References

Men's downhill